On 15 October 2021, David Amess, a British Conservative Party politician and Member of Parliament for Southend West, died after being stabbed multiple times at a constituency surgery at Belfairs Methodist Church Hall in Leigh-on-Sea, Essex. Ali Harbi Ali, a 25-year-old British man and Islamic State sympathiser, was arrested at the scene. He was found guilty of murder and the preparation of terrorist acts in April 2022, and was sentenced to life imprisonment with a whole life order.

Background

Sir David Amess was a long-serving politician who entered Parliament in 1983 as MP for Basildon; at the time of his death, he was MP for Southend West. He held no senior positions during his career but was described by journalist Nick Paton Walsh as an "instantly recognizable" member of the Conservative Party, and was knighted for his political and public service in 2015. He was a devout Catholic and a socially conservative politician who opposed abortion, supported capital punishment, and campaigned in favour of Brexit. He was a supporter of animal welfare and supported a ban on fox hunting. He also supported a campaign to award city status to Southend-on-Sea, the main town of his constituency. 

Amess's voting record on UK airstrikes in Syria as well as his membership with the Conservative Friends of Israel were later cited by Ali as motives for his murder. Ali said during police interviews that he had been influenced by the propaganda of Abu Mohammad al-Adnani, who had called on Muslims to attack people in their home countries who were deemed to be enemies of the Islamic State of Iraq and the Levant.

Following the 2016 murder of the Labour MP Jo Cox en route to a constituency surgery, the first such murder of a sitting MP since Ian Gow in 1990, Amess wrote in his 2020 autobiography that fears of similar attacks "rather spoilt the great British tradition of the people openly meeting their elected politicians", and that he had faced "nuisance from the odd member of the general public" and insecurity at his own home. MPs are protected by armed police within Parliament, with security tightened after the 2017 Westminster attack. They are generally not given police protection during surgeries, and are normally accompanied by only one member of staff. After Cox's death, parliamentary spending on MPs' personal security rose from under £200,000 to £4.5 million in two years. Amess's murder was the second killing of a British MP in five years and prompted renewed calls for better security.

Attack
On 15 October 2021, Amess held a constituency surgery at the church hall of Belfairs Methodist Church on Eastwood Road North in Leigh-on-Sea, Essex. He was scheduled to meet constituents from 10 am to 1 pm. He held a virtual meeting on Zoom with a colleague and talked to local residents on the steps of the hall before entering the building around 12:05 pm, accompanied by two female members of staff, to speak with people who had arrived earlier. While inside the church hall, a man armed with a knife emerged from a group of constituents and stabbed Amess multiple times.

Police and paramedics arrived at the scene within minutes. The suspect waited inside the church hall, where he was arrested and a police cordon was set up. An air ambulance landed at Belfairs Sports Ground to take Amess to hospital, but the medical team decided that his condition was not stable enough to transport him and so continued to work on him at the scene. His death was confirmed at 1:13 pm.

Investigation

Counter-terrorist police officers were involved in the early stages of the investigation. Essex Police said that a "25-year-old man was quickly arrested after officers arrived at the scene on suspicion of murder and a knife was recovered". Ali Harbi Ali, from Kentish Town, North London, was arrested at the scene. In 2014, as a teenager, he was referred to Prevent, the United Kingdom's voluntary programme for those thought to be at risk of radicalisation, from which he was referred on to the Channel programme. He is believed not to have spent long in the programme, and he was not a "subject of interest" to MI5. 

At approximately 6:32 pm on 15 October, Essex Police announced that the investigation had been handed over to the Counter Terrorism Command of London's Metropolitan Police Service. On the evening of 16 October, the Metropolitan Police Service confirmed the suspect had been detained under Section 41 of the Terrorism Act 2000, and that magistrates had extended the period the suspect could be held in custody for questioning until 22 October. On 17 October, police identified the stabbing as a terrorist incident potentially motivated by Islamic extremism. Police searched three addresses in London over the weekend following the stabbing.

On 21 October, a prosecutor told Westminster Magistrates' Court that Ali considered himself an affiliate of the Islamic State and that he had planned the attack two years in advance. The court also heard that his actions were "connected to the conflict in Syria".

Legal proceedings
When taken to Southend police station, Ali told the booking officer that he had committed "terror". When asked for his motive, he said "religious". In a police interview, he said "I mean, I guess yeah, I killed an MP. I done it, so yeah", then said he regretted that statement because it sounded like a Little Britain sketch. He said that Amess was suspicious of him and thought he was an undercover reporter.

On 21 October 2021, Ali was charged with the murder of Amess and the prior preparation of terrorist acts. On 22 October, he appeared at London's Old Bailey via video link from HMP Belmarsh, during which he was remanded in custody.

On 27 October, an inquest was opened into Amess's death, but it was immediately suspended "pending the outcome of the criminal proceedings". The suspension would be reviewed in April 2022. Coroner's officer Paul Donaghy told the inquest that, the day after Amess's death, a Home Office pathologist carried out a post-mortem examination, which showed that Amess had died from multiple stab wounds to the chest.

At a plea hearing on 21 December, Ali entered not guilty pleas for the charges of murder and preparing acts of terrorism. He was again remanded in custody.

The trial of Ali began on 21 March 2022, at the Old Bailey in London. Prosecutor Tom Little QC described the defendant as a "radicalised Islamist terrorist" and described the killing as a "murder carried out because of a warped and twisted and violent ideology". Little said the defendant had researched a list of "523 MPs who carried out a vote to carry out airstrikes in Syria", using the website TheyWorkForYou and had then carried out reconnaissance trips, including six visits to the address of Michael Gove in west London in 2021. Ali had researched other MPs, including Mike Freer and Sir Keir Starmer. Ali had visited Freer's constituency office on 17 September 2021, but he was not there as he was attending other meetings. In total, Ali researched over 250 MPs; Jess Phillips said that she was shocked that she was not informed that she was one of them until after Ali's conviction. On 11 April, Ali was found guilty of murder and the preparation of terrorist acts. He refused to stand up to receive the verdict, citing religious beliefs and saying he had "no regrets" in what he did. On 13 April, Mr Justice Sweeney sentenced Ali to life imprisonment with a whole life order, saying that the murder "struck at the heart of our democracy", and described Ali as a "cold, calculated and dangerous individual".

Reactions
After the attack, Prime Minister Boris Johnson returned to London, where flags were lowered to half-mast. Various parliamentary groups, and current and former politicians from across the political spectrum, expressed shock and offered condolences, as did members of the British royal family, international politicians, and relatives of Jo Cox. A vigil for Amess was held in his Southend West constituency at 6 pm on the day of his death, and another the next day.

Sir Lindsay Hoyle, Speaker of the House of Commons, announced that the security of MPs would be reviewed. The safety of MPs during open, public constituency surgeries was debated by politicians. Calls to enact a law to crack down on online targeting of MPs and end anonymity were made. The Conservatives suspended political campaigning.

Sir Ed Davey, the leader of the Liberal Democrats paid tribute to Amess in a speech in the House of Commons.

A Catholic priest reported he was not allowed to enter the crime scene to administer the last rites for Amess. Following the killing, British Catholic policymakers issued statements affirming Amess's commitment to his faith and lauding his achievements. Labour MP Mike Kane also sought to add an "Amess amendment" to the Police, Crime, Sentencing and Courts Bill that would ensure Catholic priests are able to gain access to crime scenes in order to administer the last rites.

On 16 October, Johnson and Leader of the Opposition Sir Keir Starmer, accompanied by Hoyle and Home Secretary Priti Patel, laid wreaths at the church hall where Amess was killed. On 18 October, a minute's silence was held in the House of Commons before MPs paid tribute to Amess. That evening, a service of remembrance for Amess, attended by MPs, was held at St Margaret's, Westminster. The service included an address by the Archbishop of Canterbury, Justin Welby. MPs paid tribute in a book of condolence that was placed in the House of Commons Library, as well as in Westminster Hall and Portcullis House. Tributes were also laid at Belfairs Methodist Church, where Amess was killed.

In the days following Amess's death, a number of MPs, including the Conservative Chris Skidmore and Labour's Charlotte Nichols, voiced their support for a campaign to grant city status to Southend-on-Sea as a way of honouring Amess's memory; he had frequently spoken on the topic in Parliament. During tributes to Amess in the House of Commons on 18 October, Johnson announced that Queen Elizabeth II had consented to Southend being given city status. Southend officially became a city at a ceremony on 1 March 2022, with Charles, Prince of Wales, presenting letters patent from the Queen.

As a result of Amess's death, a by-election was triggered to fill his former seat. Major and minor parties announced they would not stand a candidate to oppose the Conservatives as a sign of respect, following the precedent set in the 2016 Batley and Spen by-election after the murder of Jo Cox. The Conservative candidate Anna Firth won the by-election on 3 February 2022.

Following the arrest of Ali, who is London-born of Somali ancestry, British Somalis reported being subject to abuse, harassment, and death threats.

A procession and memorial service took place at St Mary's Church, the Anglican parish church in Prittlewell, on 22 November. A family statement was read by the former Conservative MP Ann Widdecombe. Afterwards his casket was processed through the streets in a horse-drawn hearse. A Catholic funeral service was held at Westminster Cathedral on the following day. Johnson was joined by Hoyle, Starmer, and former prime ministers at the service. A message from Pope Francis was delivered by Archbishop Claudio Gugerotti, Apostolic Nuncio to Great Britain.

See also
List of prisoners with whole life orders
 Operation Bridger

References

2021 in British politics
2021 in England
2021 murders in the United Kingdom
2020s in Essex
Attacks in the United Kingdom in 2021
Attacks on British politicians
Deaths by person in England
Islamic terrorism in England
Islamic terrorist incidents in 2021
Murder in Essex
Murder trials
October 2021 events in the United Kingdom
October 2021 crimes in Europe
Southend-on-Sea (district)
Stabbing attacks in 2021
Stabbing attacks in England
Terrorist incidents in the United Kingdom in 2021
Political violence in England